Over the Rainbow is a 2006 South Korean television series starring Ji Hyun-woo, Seo Ji-hye, Hwanhee, and Kim Ok-vin. It aired on MBC from July 26 to September 14, 2006 on Wednesdays and Thursdays at 21:55 for 16 episodes.

Synopsis
Over the Rainbow is about three people who love to dance. Jeong Hee-su ran away from her father in New Zealand and tried to make a go as a singer in Seoul. She ended up renting a room in Kwon Hyeok-ju's home and helped him realized his talent in dancing. Her main goal was to become famous and for that she turned to the famous singer Rex and dumped her boyfriend Hyeok-ju. Rex didn't mind being used and helped her along even though Hee-su wasn't that talented. Then there was this oddball, Sang-mi, who was a huge fan of Rex. She was poor but full of passion for doing the things she loved. At first, she was despised by everyone but bit by bit she won people over. Hyeok-ju began to develop feelings for her. Things went crazy when Rex started to fall for Sang-mi.

Hyeok-ju and his group, Gangster, are signed on to Pride, the company of which Rex and Hee-su are part of. They are signed on because Rex's popularity is falling because his fans feel that he doesn't have as much passion in his singing as he used to have. Sang-mi was the stylist for Gangster when they were still anonymous, but the president of Pride didn't let her be their stylist anymore, so she instead became Rex's stylist, after an intense scene between Sang-mi and Rex, which Hyeok-ju was not pleased about. Hee-su destroys her own career by singing live, since she cannot sing well, and it is difficult to sing and dance at the same time. She takes pills and is almost in critical condition. Hyeok-ju rushes to the hospital, and Sang-mi follows, and Rex tries to stop her. When she insists on going, he takes her there in his car.

Hyeok-ju and Hee-su reconcile, and Sang-mi walks into the hospital room when they are hugging and Hee-su is crying. She feels like an outsider and leaves, and Rex, seeing her face, takes her to a karaoke place. He sings her his song "Tomorrow" and puts his arm around her while she cries but tries to smile at the same time.

Eventually Rex falls in love with Sang-mi, but Sang-mi is still in love with Hyeok-ju.

Cast
Ji Hyun-woo as Kwon Hyeok-ju 
Seo Ji-hye as Ma Sang-mi 
Hwanhee as Rex 
Kim Ok-vin as Jeong Hee-su 
Nam Hyun-joon as Manjong 
Choi Kwon as Choi Kyu-ho ("King Mart")
Shin Hyun-tak as Oh Young-dal
Yoo Hyun-jae as "Smarty"
Im Ha-ryong as Kwon Sang-bok
Kim Hye-ok as Lee Mi-ja
Na Hye-mi as Kwon Ji-hye
Park Hee-jin as Ma Sun-young
Kim Il-woo as Choi Nam-ki
Lee Hyung-chul as Jeong Sang-hyun 
Jung Han-yong as Mr. Park 
Jung Eun-pyo as Mang-ji
Jo Sang-gu

References

External links
 Over the Rainbow official MBC website 
 Over the Rainbow at MBC Global Media
 
 

MBC TV television dramas
2006 South Korean television series debuts
2006 South Korean television series endings
Korean-language television shows
South Korean musical television series
South Korean romance television series
Genie Music